Saadhika Randhawa, also known as Saadhika, is an Indian actress. She has mainly appeared in Hindi language Bollywood movies and has also worked in several regional language movies including in Tamil, Telugu, Punjabi, Gujarati, Marathi & Bhojpuri movie industry.

Saadhika made her debut in 1995 in Sanam Harjai. After that, she performed in 1997 with Saawan Kumar's Salma Pe Dil Aa Gaya, opposite Ayub Khan. Saadhika appeared in a number of films in multiple languages including Hafta Vasuli, Suswagatham, Ab Ke Baras, Pyaasa, 2 October, Kash Aap Hamare Hote, Shikaar, Bullet: Ek Dhamaka and Aggar. Starting 2010, she has played the lead in female centric movies like the Punjabi film Simran and Hindi movies Rivaaz, Chand Ke Pare and Bhanwari Ka Jaal.

Personal life 
Her elder sister is model and actress Jesse Randhawa.

Career

1993 - 1997 : Debut and breakthrough

She emailed her photographs to Saawan Kumar. He signed her alongside Simran for Sanam Harjai which released in 1995. It was the first Indian film to be shot in New Zealand. This movie upon its release failed to make an impact at the box office. In 1997 she went on to star as the title lead Salma in the film Salma Pe Dil Aa Gaya opposite actor Ayub Khan. The same year she also made her debut there with Telugu movie Hello I Love You.

1998 - 2009 : Success in commercial movies

Starting 1998, she worked in films in the movie industry of South India. While in Bollywood she featured with actor Ayub Khan once again in the multi starrer Hafta Vasuli.

In the year 2000, she did a full time return to Bollywood and played the lead in Sabse Bada Beiman. She had several releases in 2002 like Kaaboo, Ab Ke Baras and Pyaasa. She played character with shades of grey in Kash Aap Hamare Hote (2003), Shikaar (2004) and Bullet: Ek Dhamaka (2005). She later signed projects like Ananth opposite Krushna Abhishek, Raj Sippy's Mr.Khujali, Ravi Sinha's Ghaav opposite Hyder Khan, The Real Cyanide, My Friend Ganesha 4 and producer Ved Gandhi's Aye Watan. All of these got shelved, remain unreleased and from some she opted out due to shooting date related issues. Saadhika played glamorous roles in Aggar (2007), Phir Tauba Tauba (2008) and Meri Padosan (2009). She also appeared in item numbers in several films like Choosoddaam Randi (2000), Satta (2003), Janam Janam Ke Saath (2007) and Wake Up India (2013). She has featured in album songs like Yeh Kaali Kaali Aakhen Remix sung by Aditya Narayan and worked with popular singer Daler Mehndi in his music video album Nabi Buba Nabi.

Saadhika has also featured in Bhojpuri cinema, including the films Pyar Ke Bandhan and Purab. She paired with Ravi Kishan in the films Dharam Veer, Paandav and Chandu Ki Chameli. She also worked in other Bhojpuri movies like Brijwa, Saat Saheliyan and Abhay Sinha's Janam Janam Ke Saath.

2010 - Present : Shift to realistic cinema

In 2010, she played the title role in the Punjabi movie Simran opposite actor Guggu Gill. This movie was based on the concept of loving the girl child. She was then seen opposite actor Naveen Vadde in Telugu movie Uncle Aunty Nandagopal. The following year she played a village belle in Hindi movie Rivaaz. Her other notable releases are Sai Ek Prerna (2011), Chand Ke Pare (2012), Saanwariya - Khatu Shyam Ji Ki Amar Gatha (2013) and Bhanwari Ka Jaal (2014). She played the role of a ghost in the movie Anhoni Saya which saw a digital release in 2016. Her most recent release was director Vicky Ranawat's Satya Sai Baba in January 2021 where she featured with actor Jackie Shroff and has singer Anup Jalota playing the titular role. This movie was released in four languages - English, Hindi, Telugu and Marathi. She is currently shooting for its sequel Satya Sai Baba 2 which is the directorial debut of singer Anup Jalota.

Television work

Throughout her career she kept balancing her commitments to movies with big budget Television serials. She played the role of a top model opposite actor Sanjay Kapoor in Karishma - The Miracles of Destiny and was seen in a traditional look in Jhilmil Sitaron Ka Aangan Hoga. She played the role of Indumati in the mythological Shobha Somnath Ki. She played lead role in 2009 Doordarshan serials Ek Din Achanak (TV series) and Panaah. She was seen as the title lead in Chandramukhi directed by Sunil Agnihotri and producer Dheeraj Kumar's family drama Hamari Bahu Tulsi. She started her own production company and during 2014 - 2016 she produced and acted as the lead in the Doordarshan prime time weekend show Janmon Ka Bandhan.

She is the winner of the 4th Annual Cinema Aajtak Achievers Awards (2020) under the Award category - Most Gorgeous Actress in Bollywood.

Filmography 
 Satya Sai Baba 2 (Filming)
 Aye Watan (Unreleased)
  The Real Cyanide (Unreleased)
 O Ammayi Crime Story (2021) (Telugu film)
 Satya Sai Baba (2021) (Hindi, Telugu & Marathi film)
 Anhoni Saya (2016)
 Love in Cairo (2015)
 Bhanwari Ka Jaal (2014)
 My Friend Ganesha 4 (2013)
 Wake Up India (2013) - Guest Appearance
 Saanwariya (2013)
 Chand Ke Pare (2012)
 Rivaaz (2011)
 Black & White Fact (2011)
 Sai Ek Prerna (2011)
 Saat Saheliyan (2010) (Bhojpuri film) - Guest Appearance
 Chandu Ki Chameli (2010) (Bhojpuri film)
 Dharmatma (2010) (Bhojpuri film)
 Sariya, Thavara (2010) (Tamil film)
 Aunty Uncle Nandagopal (2010) (Telugu film)
 Simran (2010) (Punjabi film)
 Meri Padosan (2009)
 Sun La Arajiya Hamar (2009) (Bhojpuri film)
 Brijwa (2009) (Bhojpuri film)
 Dharam Veer (2008) (Bhojpuri film)
 Phir Tauba Tauba (2008) – Rubina
 Aggar (2007)
 Love In India (2007)
 Khallas Beginning of the end (2007) - Guest Appearance
 Janam Janam Ke Saath (2007) (Bhojpuri film) - Guest Appearance
 Paandav (2007) (Bhojpuri film)
 Purab Man from the east (2007) (Bhojpuri film)
 Pyar Ke Bandhan (2006) (Bhojpuri film)
 Manoranjan (2006) - Guest Appearance
 Model The Beauty (2005)
 Dhamkee The Extortion (2005)
 Bullet: Ek Dhamaka (2005) – Saadhika
 Shikaar (2004) – Kamya
 2 October (2003)
 Kash Aap Hamare Hote (2003) – Simone
 Satta (2003) – Guest appearance
 Khajuraho The Divine Temple (2002) (Hindi & Tamil)
 Pyaasa (2002) – Suman
 Kaaboo (2002)
 Ab Ke Baras (2002)
 Sabse Bada Beiman (2000)
 Goppinti Alludu (2000) (Telugu film)
 Choosoddaam Randi (2000) (Telugu film) - Guest Appearance
 Daldu Chorayu Dhire Dhire (2000) – Radha (Gujarati film)
 Yamajathakudu (1999) – Pothana (Telugu film)
 Mother (1999) - Guest Appearance
 Hafta Vasuli (1998) – Radha
 Suswagatham (1998) (Telugu film)
 Sambhavam (1998) – Sirisha (Malayalam film)
 Salma Pe Dil Aa Gaya (1997)
 Hello I Love You (1997) – Raja Hamsa (Telugu film)
 Sanam Harjai (1995)

TV Shows 

 Karishma - The Miracles of Destiny (2003 - 2004) as Saadhika
 Chandramukhi (2007) as Chandramukhi (Title Lead)
 Hamari Bahu Tulsi (2007 - 2008) as Anamika/Tulsi (Title Lead)
 Ek Din Achanak (TV series) (2009) as Reema Roy (Female Lead)
 Panaah (2009)
 Shobha Somnath Ki (2012) as Indumati
 Janmo Ka Bandhan (2014 - 2015)

References

External links 
 
 Saadhika Success Mantra

Living people
Actresses from Mumbai
Actresses in Hindi cinema
Indian film actresses
20th-century Indian actresses
Actresses in Telugu cinema
Actresses in Tamil cinema
Actresses in Punjabi cinema
Actresses in Gujarati cinema
Actresses in Marathi cinema
Actresses in Bhojpuri cinema
21st-century Indian actresses
1977 births